Bulgwang-dong is a neighbourhood (dong) of Eunpyeong-gu in Seoul, South Korea. It originated from the fact that there are many large and small temples, including rocks and Bulgwangsa Temple, located at the foot of Bukhansan Mountain (Samgaksan Mountain).

See also 
Administrative divisions of South Korea

References

External links
Eunpyeong-gu official website
 Eunpyeong-gu map at the Eunpyeong-gu official website
 Bulgwang 1-dong resident office website

Neighbourhoods of Eunpyeong District